Radical 118 or radical bamboo meaning "bamboo" is one of the 29 Kangxi radicals (214 radicals in total) composed of 6 strokes. The radical character usually appears at the top of characters and transforms into .

In the Kangxi Dictionary, there are 953 characters (out of 49,030) to be found under this radical.

 is also the 135th indexing component in the Table of Indexing Chinese Character Components predominantly adopted by Simplified Chinese dictionaries published in mainland China, with  being its associated indexing component.

Evolution

Derived characters

Literature

External links

Unihan Database - U+7AF9

118
135